Stila Cosmetics is an American cosmetics company founded in 1994. The cosmetics line was created by makeup artist Jeanine Lobell. The name Stila (pronounced STEE-la) was derived from the Swedish word "stil," which can mean "style". Stila's official website is quoted as saying that they chose that name because they believe "every woman’s makeup should be as individual as her own signature".  Jeanine Lobell writes on her blog that, "We kind of just made up the name, ‘Stila.’ It sounds sort of like stil in Swedish, which means style." Lobell grew up in Sweden.

Estée Lauder Companies bought Stila in 1999 and sold it to Sun Capital Partners, Inc in the spring of 2006. In 2009, Stila became a Lynn Tilton company when it was sold to the private equity fund Patriarch Partners, LLC.

Marketing 
In 2013, Stila worked in collaboration with Woodbury University to present the Neo-Tribes Runway Event that premiered at the Natural History Museum of Los Angeles and Los Angeles Center Studios. The show sold out its 1,000 plus tickets, hosted by celebrity stylist Lisa Kline and produced under the mentorship of acclaimed designers Jared Gold, Eduardo Lucero and Eddie Bledsoe. The show featured composition by pianista Dora De Marinis, collections inspired by Bram Stoker's Dracula, fresh talent and craftsmen including Black Lightning costume designer Jennifer Erin Davis, crowd-favorites Drew Kessler & Andrea Dorian Pellecer, best actress winner Rene Michelle Aranda, touring architect Alán Ramiro Manning, model Allis K. Joseph, singer-songwriter Landon Argabrite and other active influencers and performers from the creative industries. Stila provided the makeup products and artists for the live-broadcast event, May 1st and 2nd.

References

External links 
Official site
Article about Jeanine Lobell
Article announcing Lauder's sale of Stila to Sun Capital Partners
Sun Capital Partners' portfolio companies

Cosmetics companies of the United States
Chemical companies established in 1994
History of cosmetics
1994 establishments in the United States